Ali Saleh Ali Saleh Amro (born 22 January 2000), or simply Ali Saleh, is an Emirati professional footballer who plays for Emirati club Al Wasl.

Personal life 
He was born in Dubai, with a Scottish mother and an Emirati father, accrediting his family as the driving force for his football passion. He is a fan of Manchester United and stated that he would love to play in the English Premier League one day, having taken a week training in the boot camp of the club and posting photo with fellow Scottish manager Alex Ferguson.

Career statistics

Club

International

Scores and results list the United Arab Emirates' goal tally first.

References

External links
 

2000 births
Living people
Emirati people of Scottish descent
Sportspeople from Dubai
Emirati footballers
United Arab Emirates international footballers
Association football forwards
UAE Pro League players
Al-Wasl F.C. players